The mayor of Peterborough is an elected official who serves as the head of the municipal government of Peterborough. The mayor is a member of city council, which is an elected body that is responsible for developing policies, programs and services of the municipality; representing constituents in municipal government; and providing governance over the corporation of the municipality. The Mayor leads Council and acts as the Chairperson of council meetings, as the Chief Executive Officer for the corporation, and as the representative for the municipality.

Between 1850 and 1859, when Peterborough first became a township, aldermen were elected every January and these elected officials appointed a mayor, reeve and deputy reeve from among their numbers. In 1860, this changed and the public was able to vote for mayor at the polls.

On Canada Day 1905, the town of Peterborough and the village of Ashburnham amalgamated — creating the City of Peterborough. This merger changed Peterborough's municipal status from 'town' to 'city' and accordingly Peterborough Town Council became Peterborough City Council.

Currently, municipal elections are held every four years and voters are able to cast their ballot for a mayoral candidate as well as candidates in their home ward. Mayors serve a term of four years and may run for re-election indefinitely as there are no term limits.

List of Peterborough Mayors

Peterborough Town Council (1850-1905)

Peterborough City Council (1905-present)

References

External links 

Mayor's Office City of Peterborough.

Peterborough